This is a list of notable events in Latin music (i.e. Spanish- and Portuguese-speaking music from Latin America, Latin Europe, and the United States) that took place in 2007.

Events
November 8 The 8th Annual Latin Grammy Awards are held at the Mandalay Bay Events Center in Paradise, Nevada.
Dominican singer-songwriter Juan Luis Guerra is the most awarded artist of the song with his "La Llave de Mi Corazón" winning the awards for Record of the Year and Song of the Year as well as Album of the Year for the album of the same name. He is also honored as the Latin Recording Academy Person of the Year.
Jesse & Joy wins Best New Artist.

Number-ones albums and singles by country
List of number-one singles of 2007 (Spain)
List of number-one Billboard Top Latin Albums of 2007
List of number-one Billboard Hot Latin Songs of 2007

Awards
2007 Premio Lo Nuestro
2007 Billboard Latin Music Awards
2007 Latin Grammy Awards
2007 Tejano Music Awards

Albums released

First quarter

January

February

March

Second quarter

April

May

June

Third quarter

July

August

September

First quarter

October

November

December

Unknown dates

Best-selling records

Best-selling albums
The following is a list of the top 10 best-selling Latin albums in the United States in 2007, according to Billboard.

Best-performing songs
The following is a list of the top 10 best-performing Latin songs in the United States in 2007, according to Billboard.

Deaths

References 

 
Latin music by year